The 1991–92 Kategoria e Dytë was the 45th season of a second-tier association football league in Albania.

The 2nd Division 1991/92, after the upheavals of 1991, takes on a new guise. The 24 participating teams are divided into two groups for the regular season, in which they only play the first round. In the second round, each group is split into four groups by geographical areas (North and South) with the teams retaining the points of the first phase: the winners of each group pass to the final knockout phase (from the quarterfinals to the final). Sopoti Librazhd and Punëtori Patos make it to the final, earning promotion to the 1st Division, with the first qualifying division champion on penalties. KF Memaliaj is relegated to the lower divisions, in which KF Selenica will also sink, which, relegated from the 1st Division, will not be accepted in the 2nd Division 1992/93. They will be replaced by two new clubs, the Amaro Divas Tirana and the Iliria Fushë-Krujë.

First round

Group A

Group B 

Note: All clubs were qualified to the second round

Second round

Northern Groups

Group A

Group B

Group C

Group D

Southern Groups

Group A

Group B

Group C

Group D

Third round

Quarterfinals

Semifinals

Final 

 Sopoti and Punëtori were promoted to 1992–93 National Championship.

References

 Giovanni Armillotta
 Calcio Mondiale Web

Kategoria e Parë seasons
2
Alba